Jagara may refer to:

 Jagara people, an ethnic group of Australia
 Jagara language, formerly spoken by them
 Jagara (ThunderCats), a fictional character
 Jagara, Assam, a village in India

See also 
 Jagera (disambiguation)